The Encyclopaedia of the Qurʾān (abbreviated EQ) is an encyclopedia dedicated to Quranic Studies edited by Islamic scholar Jane Dammen McAuliffe, and published by Brill Publishers.

It was published in five volumes during 2001-2006:

 Vol. I: A-D (publication year 2001)
 Vol. II: E-I (2002)
 Vol. III: J-O (2003)
 Vol. IV: P-Sh (2004)
 Vol. V: Si-Z (2006)
 Index Vol. (2006)

See also 
 Encyclopaedia of Islam
 Encyclopaedia Iranica

References

External links
Encyclopaedia of the Qurʾān Online
 Publisher site: Encyclopaedia of the Qur'an at Brill publishers
 Review: 
 Another encyclopaedia: Integrated Encyclopedia of the Qur'an at IEQ project

Qur'an, Encyclopaedia of
Non-Islamic Islam studies literature
Works about the Quran
21st-century encyclopedias